The West Island Way is a waymarked long distance footpath on the Isle of Bute. The route opened in September 2000 as part of Bute's millennium celebrations, and was the first waymarked long distance route on a Scottish island. As of 2018 it was estimated that between six and seven thousand people were using the trail each year. The route is designated as one of Scotland's Great Trails by NatureScot.

Description
The route begins at Kilchattan Bay in the south of the island, and finishes at Port Bannatyne in the north, with Rothesay, the main town on Bute, as a central point. The hike can be completed over two fairly lengthy walking days, or four shorter days. The official map and guide of the route is available from the Bute Discovery Centre in Rothesay.

Footnotes

External links
Official Website

Scotland's Great Trails
Isle of Bute
Footpaths in Argyll and Bute